Spaulding High School and the Central Vermont Career Center has a long history in the city of Barre.  Established in 1890, the school is located at 155 Ayers Street with Luke Aither as principal of the high school and Jody Emerson director of the Career Center.

History 

Spaulding High School is named after Jacob Shedd Spaulding (1811–1880) who was a teacher and principal of the private school called Barre Academy established on what later became the site of the  Vermont History Center on Washington Street in Barre. Spaulding was a graduate of Dartmouth College and a teacher at the academy in Bakersfield, Vermont before coming to Barre. In the late 1880s, Barre's population began to grow due to the influx of immigrants who came to work in the Granite Industry making the Barre Academy obsolete. In 1890, a larger and more modern building was erected called the Spaulding Graded School. Designed by Vermont architect Lambert Packard of St. Johnsbury, the new building made of brick and Barre granite, mimicked the Richardsonian Romanesque popular in the mid-19th Century with "large, round-arched entranceways, recessed windows with contrasting sills, carved capitals, and the characteristic towers and turrets."

Situated at the top of Washington Street, the new Spaulding Graded school housed both elementary and high school students.  The student population quickly outgrew the space and five new schools were created to house the lower grades.  By 1895, the building contained grades nine through twelve and was renamed Spaulding High School.  In 1963, construction of a new high school began and in the early spring of 1965, the school moved to its current location at 155 Ayers Street with Dr. Antatole G. Pendo as its principal.  Speaking at the dedication, former Vermont Governor, Dr. Deane C. Davis said, "this new high school building will have a tremendous influence upon the lives of thousands and thousands of future students. The opportunity is here." Over the course of the past 40 years, the building has grown and expanded to include the Central Vermont Career Center.  The vacated Spaulding building would eventually house the Vermont History Center; home to the Vermont Historical Society.

Today 

Noted as the longest operational high school in the state, Spaulding High School just celebrated its 125 Anniversary in 2015 and serves the children of Barre City and Barre Town.  Not only does the building house the high school, it also contains the Central Vermont Career Center pulling in students from a variety of area schools including Montpelier, U32, Harwood, and Twinfield. The Central Vermont Career Center offers a variety of programs that include, Automotive Technology, Baking and Culinary Arts, Building Trades, Cosmetology, and Digital Media Arts. In addition, Act 77 has charged Vermont secondary school educators to create personalized learning environments that offer flexible pathways to
graduation. Spaulding High School offers a duel enrollment program, early college options, increased opportunities for work-based learning, and virtual learning opportunities. 
As with many schools, SHS has experienced a decline in enrollment in recent years, yet remains steady with a current population of 700 students and just over 60 educators in the high school and 21 educators in the Career Center.  Reflective of the community at large, the diversity at Spaulding is low at 7.86% as of November 2015, with a fairly balanced male/female ration.  The diversity breakdown of the Career Center is similar, however, the ratio of male students to female students is a little less than 2/1.  Spaulding's per pupil spending is one of the lowest in the state at just over $12,000.  While a small urban school, economically, Barre has pockets of poverty as 37.5% of the High School students are on free or reduced lunches as is 43.4% in the Career Center.

SHS offers a wide variety of course offerings from basic courses to AP.

Athletics

Recognition
The school has won the state championships in the following sports:
Boys' basketball - 1932, 1934, 1938, 1945, 1950, 1951, 1961, 1962, 1963, 1964, 1994, 2002
Girls' basketball - 2009
Boys' ice hockey - 1969, 1970, 1980, 1996, 1997, 2010
Girls' ice hockey - 2020
Baseball - 1958, 1959, 1962, 1965, 1970, 1990, 2022
Softball - 1987, 1990, 1999
Field hockey - 1983, 1989, 1991, 1992, 1997
Girls' soccer - 2001
Football (Division 2) - 2007, 2008, 2009, 2010
Wrestling (Division 2) - 1992, 1995, 1998, 1999
Boys' golf - 1995, 1996
Wrestling (Division 1) - 1976, 1977, 1978, 1984

Notable faculty
Paul N. Poirier, social studies and physical education teacher
Fred Swan, mathematics teacher
Arthur Zorn, music teacher

Notable alumni
Alexander V. Acebo (1946), Vermont Auditor of Accounts.
David Ball (2002), professional football player.
Edna Beard (1896), first woman to serve in Vermont House of Representatives, and first to serve in Vermont Senate.
Madelyn Davidson (1931), Vermont State Treasurer.
Deane C. Davis (1918), Governor of Vermont.
Lena Giudici (1917), one of Vermont's first female attorneys 
Donald Milne (1952), longtime clerk of the Vermont House of Representatives.
James F. Milne (1968), Secretary of State of Vermont.
Scott Milne (1977), Republican nominee for Governor of Vermont in 2014, and US Senate in 2016.
Charles Poletti (1920), Governor of New York.
Phil Scott (1976), Governor of Vermont.
Steve Slayton (1920), pitcher for the 1928 Boston Red Sox.

References

External links
 Official website

Barre, Vermont
Schools in Washington County, Vermont
Public high schools in Vermont
1890 establishments in Vermont